Judith Florence Amoore-Pollock (born 25 June 1940) is an Australian former runner. She was born in Melbourne, Victoria.

At the 1964 Summer Olympics in Tokyo, she won a bronze medal in the first 400 metres race for females, only beaten by countrywoman Betty Cuthbert (gold) and Brit Ann Packer (silver). At the 1966 British Empire and Commonwealth Games in Kingston, Jamaica, she won the 440 yards race, a silver medal over 880 yards, and was fourth in the 220 yards.

At the Australian championships in February 1964, she placed 3rd in 440 yards and 2nd in 880 yards. In 1966 she competed in 100 yards without reaching the final, but placed 3rd in 220 Yards, 1st in 440 yards and in 880 yards. In the state championships of Victoria, she won both 220, 440 and 880 yards races.

She set world records at 440 yards (1965), 800 metres (1967) and 880 yards (1967) before retiring due to pregnancy in 1968. She made a comeback in 1971, running some of her best times ever to make the team for the 1972 Summer Olympics in Munich. She was track and field team captain at Munich, but was unable to compete because of injuries and retired soon after the Games, again for family reasons.

In 1976, she made another comeback, now concentrating on 800 metres and 1500 metres events. The veteran was selected in her third Olympic team after winning the 1500 metres at the Australian National Championships and running second to Charlene Rendina over 800 metres.

At the age of 36, she became the oldest Australian female Olympian at the 1976 Summer Olympics in Montreal, Quebec. Running in the 800 metres, she just missed the final, clocking her fastest ever time of 1:59.93 for fifth in her semi-final. Despite setting another personal best time in the 1500 metres, she was run out of her heat.

She was inducted into the Sport Australia Hall of Fame in 1988.

References

External links 
 
 
 
 
 
 
 

1940 births
Living people
Australian female sprinters
Australian female middle-distance runners
Athletes (track and field) at the 1964 Summer Olympics
Athletes (track and field) at the 1976 Summer Olympics
Olympic athletes of Australia
Olympic bronze medalists for Australia
Sportswomen from Victoria (Australia)
Commonwealth Games gold medallists for Australia
Commonwealth Games silver medallists for Australia
World record setters in athletics (track and field)
Athletes (track and field) at the 1966 British Empire and Commonwealth Games
Commonwealth Games medallists in athletics
Sport Australia Hall of Fame inductees
Athletes from Melbourne
Medalists at the 1964 Summer Olympics
Olympic bronze medalists in athletics (track and field)
Olympic female sprinters
Medallists at the 1966 British Empire and Commonwealth Games